Enugu may refer to:

 Enugu, a city in southeastern Nigeria
 Enugu State, a state in Nigeria
 Enugu Rangers, the home association football team of Enugu State
 Enugu (crater)